Roman Road railway station was a station on the Leeds and Selby Railway, near Micklefield, in West Yorkshire, England. The station was one of the shortest lived stations in the United Kingdom opening on 22 September 1834 and closing less than two months later on 10 November 1834.

The opening of the station coincided with the opening of the line but on 31 October 1834 the directors of the company "Ordered stopping places at Cross Gates and Roman Road be abandoned from 8th November next."

Fares to Leeds were 6d dearer at 2/6 and 1/6 respectively.

References

Disused railway stations in Leeds
Former Leeds and Selby Railway stations
Railway stations in Great Britain opened in 1834
Railway stations in Great Britain closed in 1834
1834 establishments in England
1834 disestablishments in England